The Taliabu masked owl (Tyto nigrobrunnea), also known as the Taliabu owl or the Sula Islands barn owl, is an owl in the barn owl family, Tytonidae. This is one of the two groups of owls, the other being the typical owls, family Strigidae. It is endemic to Taliabu Island of Indonesia.

The species is known only from one specimen, an adult female collected in 1938.  One recent sighting in 1991 has not been confirmed, leading some experts to doubt its continued existence.

References

External links
BirdLife Species Factsheet

Taliabu masked owl
Birds of the Sula Islands
Taliabu masked owl
Taxa named by Oscar Neumann